{{DISPLAYTITLE:C20H22O8}}

The molecular formula C20H22O8 (molar mass: 390.38 g/mol, exact mass: 390.131468 u) may refer to:

 Piceid (resveratrol-3-O-β-D-glucopyranoside), a stilbenoid
 Populin, a glucoside
 Resveratroloside (resveratrol-4'-O-β-D-glucopyranoside), a stilbenoid